2000–01 Országos Bajnokság I (men's water polo) was the 95th water polo championship in Hungary.

First stage 

Pld - Played; W - Won; L - Lost; PF - Points for; PA - Points against; Diff - Difference; Pts - Points.

Second stage

Championship Round 

Pld - Played; W - Won; L - Lost; PF - Points for; PA - Points against; Diff - Difference; Pts - Points.

Relegation Round 

Pld - Played; W - Won; L - Lost; PF - Points for; PA - Points against; Diff - Difference; Pts - Points.

Championship Playoff

Final standing

Sources 
Magyar sportévkönyv 2002

Seasons in Hungarian water polo competitions
Hungary
2000 in water polo
2000 in Hungarian sport
2001 in water polo
2001 in Hungarian sport